Roman Glavatskikh (born 3 May 1983 in Novoural'sk, USSR) is a Russian futsal player. Forward of the Moscow club Dina Moscow.

Biography
Glavatskikh was born in the city of Novouralsk, the Sverdlovsk region. There he began his futsal career, becoming a player of a local club "Stroitel”, which was playing in the premiere league for that moment, the second division in the structure of national futsal. There he played for three seasons, then moved to Glazov "Progress", and later - to Yekaterinburg "UPI-DDT". With that team he debuted in the Super League.

In 2004 Glavatskikh moved to "Spartak" (Moscow), one and half season later – to "Norilsk Nickel". In these clubs Roman failed to express himself. He played much better in the Moscow club "Spartak-Schelkovo", to which he moved in 2007.
In 2009 Glavatskikh left "Spartak Schelkovo" due to financial problems of the club which forced the club to move to the Premiere League. The following season he spent in "Sibiryak". Roman started the next season in "Polytech" (St. Petersburg). Having spent a successful year, in the summer of 2011 he moved to Dina Moscow.

Achievements
Russian Futsal Championship Winner (1): 2014

External links
 MFK Dina Moskva profile
 AMFR profile

1983 births
Living people
MFK Dina Moskva players
Russian men's futsal players
People from Novouralsk
Sportspeople from Sverdlovsk Oblast